The Belize Act 1981 (1981 c. 52) was an Act of Parliament in the United Kingdom. It came into operation on 28 July 1981.

The Act made provisions for the nation of Belize (formerly British Honduras) to gain full independence and become a member of the Commonwealth of Nations as a Commonwealth realm; prior to this, Belize had been a fully self-governing British colony from 1973.

Belize became independent on 21 September 1981.

References

Whitaker's Almanack: for the year 1982, complete edition, p. 364. J. Whitaker & Sons, London, 1981
Chronological table of the statutes; HMSO, London. 1993. 

Belize and the Commonwealth of Nations
Independence acts in the Parliament of the United Kingdom
United Kingdom Acts of Parliament 1981
1981 in Belize
Belize–United Kingdom relations
Monarchy in Belize